PANACA is a farming theme park that promotes contact between humans and nature, intended for those who live in the city and to create awareness about nature. The park was created in Quimbaya, in the Coffee Area of Colombia by a group of businessmen in 1990, and today, is one of the biggest agricultural parks in the country. To better accommodate tourism the theme park now offers lodging. Neighboring the theme park are 2 of the parks lodging complexes called "Fincas Panaca" and "Pueblo Panaca". Fincas Panaca was founded in 2011 and consists of 62 individual villas. The project "Pueblo Panaca" started in 2017 is nearing its final phase of construction and will mimic life in a small town. Both of these projects are a great addition to an already iconic landmark.

External links
 PANACA official website
(in Spanish) FINCAS PANACA official website
(in Spanish) PUEBLO PANACA official website

Landmarks in Colombia